Rebecca Rittenhouse (born November 30, 1988) is an American actress. She has played Cody LeFever in the ABC prime time soap opera Blood & Oil, Dr. Anna Ziev in the Hulu romantic comedy series The Mindy Project, and Maggie in the Into the Dark television film episode "The Body". Rittenhouse recently starred as the titular character in the Hulu comedy series Maggie.

Early life
Rittenhouse was born in Los Angeles and grew up in Pasadena. One of her first roles was in lower school, when she was cast as the Balloon Girl in her all-girls academy's production of the musical Gypsy. She continued performing in high school, but never thought of it as a career. Rittenhouse attended the University of Pennsylvania, where she studied Romance languages. Afterwards, she decided to study acting at the Atlantic Theater Company in New York City. She considered a career in medicine while trying to get roles.

Career
Rittenhouse made her Off-Broadway debut in Commons of Pensacola written by at the Manhattan Theatre Club during the 2013–14 television season. In 2014, she made her television debut, appearing in the pilot episode of Showtime drama series, The Affair. Later in that year, Rittenhouse was cast in the series regular role as Brittany Dobler in the Fox comedy-drama, Red Band Society. The series was canceled after one season. Rittenhouse was originally considered for the female lead role in the superhero film Deadpool, but lost the part to Morena Baccarin.

In 2015, Rittenhouse was cast as the female lead Cody LeFever in the ABC prime time soap opera, Blood & Oil. In late 2017, she was cast as Keri Allen in the season seven finale of the legal drama series Suits, which served as a backdoor pilot for a potential spin-off, Pearson. However, the role was recast with Bethany Joy Lenz for the series.

Rittenhouse recently starred as interior decorator Ainsley Howard in the Hulu miniseries Four Weddings and a Funeral, a modern update on the 1994 British film of the same name, created by Mindy Kaling and Matt Warburton. She previously worked with Kaling and Warburton on The Mindy Project.

Rittenhouse is currently starring in Hulu’s television series adaptation of the 2019 film short Maggie, which has no relation to her role in the 2018 Into the Dark television film "The Body", in which she played another character named Maggie. In the Hulu comedy series, Rittenhouse stars as the titular role, a psychic who can predict the future of everyone around her. The show was originally scheduled to debut on ABC, but was moved to Hulu.

Filmography

Film

Television

References

External links
 
 
 

1988 births
21st-century American actresses
Actresses from Los Angeles
American television actresses
American soap opera actresses
Living people
University of Pennsylvania alumni